The Cash Brothers are a Canadian alternative country/folk rock duo, based in Toronto, Ontario, consisting of brothers Andrew and Peter Cash.  Their alt-country/alt-folk music includes ballads which blend acoustic and electric guitar work with vocal harmonies.

History
Prior to the creation of The Cash Brothers, Andrew and Peter Cash both had established careers as songwriters and musicians.  Andrew was a member of the bands L'Étranger and Ursula, and a solo artist, and Peter was a member of Skydiggers. Although their careers were closely connected (Skydiggers, in fact, often played as Andrew's backing band at the Spadina Hotel), they had never written or performed as a duo.

In 1996, however, Peter left his band, and Ursula disbanded. The brothers started writing songs and performing as a duo. Their debut album as The Cash Brothers, Raceway, was recorded over time at Chemical Sound and released independently in 1999.   It was re-released in the US and in Europe by Rounder Records in 2001 under the name How was Tomorrow. The pair toured with a backup band in the UK, Netherlands and the US in support of the album.

Their second album, Phonebooth Tornado, came out in 2000.

By the time their album A Brand New Night was released in 2003, the pair had toured extensively, and were developing a more electric and pop-oriented sound.  They toured in support of the album in the US.

Touring band
While on tour, the brothers travel with a backup band. Musicians who have toured with the Cash Brothers include Gord Tough, Randy Curnew, Paul Taylor and Todd Lumley.

Discography
 Raceway (1999)
 Phonebooth Tornado (2000)
 How Was Tomorrow (2001) (re-release of Raceway)
 A Brand New Night (2003)
 Skydiggers/Cash Brothers (2006)

References

External links
 

Canadian alternative country groups
Zoë Records artists